This article lists the top four teams or players in each of the various eSports world championships of the 2006 season.

Counter-Strike

Quake 4

Quake 3

Warcraft III: The Frozen Throne

Warcraft III: The Frozen Throne – Team Events

Project Gotham Racing 3

Need for Speed: Most Wanted

See also
World Cyber Games 2006
2006 CPL World Season

Notes

References

 
Esports by year